Tongue in Chic is the sixth studio album by American R&B band Chic, released on Atlantic Records in 1982. The album includes the singles "Hangin'" (R&B #48) and "I Feel Your Love Comin' On" (issued only in the Netherlands). Tongue in Chic peaked at No. 173 on the Billboard 200.

The album was the second of two projects to be written and produced by Bernard Edwards and Nile Rodgers in 1982,  the other being the soundtrack to movie Soup for One.

Tongue in Chic was transferred to compact disc and re-released by Atlantic Records/Warner Music in 1991. The album was digitally remastered and re-issued by Wounded Bird Records in 2003.

Critical reception
The Spin Alternative Record Guide wrote that the album "offers some extended nasty grooves that would soon be watered down for Bowie's Let's Dance, but the songwriting falters halfway."

Track listing
All tracks written by Bernard Edwards and Nile Rodgers.
Side A
"Hangin'" – 5:12 
"I Feel Your Love Comin' On" – 6:52
"When You Love Someone" – 5:06
Side B
"Chic (Everybody Say)" – 4:46
"Hey Fool" – 3:40
"Sharing Love" – 2:40
"City Lights" – 4:26

Personnel
 Alfa Anderson – lead vocals (A3, B2)
 Jocelyn Brown – vocals
 Michelle Cobbs – vocals
 Luci Martin – vocals
 Dolette McDonald – vocals
 Fonzi Thornton  – vocals
 Nile Rodgers – guitar, vocals
 Marty Celay – additional guitar on "When You Love Someone"
 Raymond Jones – keyboards
 Rob Sabino – keyboards
 Bernard Edwards –  bass guitar; lead vocals (A1, A2, B3)
 Tony Thompson – drums
 Sammy Figueroa – percussion
 Robert Aaron – saxophone
 Ray Maldonado – trumpet
 Gene Orloff – strings

Production
 Bernard Edwards – producer for Chic Organization Ltd.
 Nile Rodgers – producer for Chic Organization Ltd.
 Bill Scheniman – sound engineer
 Jason Corsaro, Dave "The Rave" Greenberg – second engineer
 Scott Litt – sound mix
 Bob Ludwig – mastering
 Bob Defrin – art direction
 Herbert Schulz – photography
 Recorded and mixed at Power Station NYC.
 Mastered at Atlantic Studios NYC.

References 

1982 albums
Chic (band) albums
Boogie albums
Atlantic Records albums
Albums produced by Nile Rodgers
Albums produced by Bernard Edwards